The Diocese of Jeonju is a Latin Church ecclesiastical territory or diocese of the Catholic Church in South Korea. It is in the ecclesiastical province of the metropolitan Archdiocese of Gwangju, yet depends on the missionary Roman Congregation for the Evangelization of Peoples.

Its cathedra is in the Joongang Cathedral of the Sacred Heart of Jesus, in the episcopal see of Jeonju 전주시, Jeollabuk-do 전라북도. It also has a former cathedral, now Jeondong Church of the Sacred Heart of Jesus, in Jeonju. Both are named for the Sacred Heart of Jesus.

History 
 Established on 13 April 1937 by Pope Pius XI as the Apostolic Prefecture of Zenshu, on territory split off from the then Apostolic Vicariate of Taiku
 Renamed on 12 July 1950 by Pope Pius XII as Apostolic Prefecture of Jeonju 전주 / Chŏnju / 全州 (正體中文) / Ieoniuen(sis) (Latin)
 Promoted on 21 January 1957 as Apostolic Vicariate of Jeonju 전주 / Chŏnju / 全州 (正體中文) / Ieoniuen(sis) (Latin), hence entitled to a titular bishop.
 Promoted again by Pope John XXIII on 10 March 1962 as Diocese of Jeonju 전주 / Chŏnju / 全州 (正體中文) / Ieoniuen(sis) (Latin)

Statistics 
, it pastorally served 190,465 Catholics (10.2% of 1,872,965 total) on 8,066 km2 in 93 parishes and 5 missions with 213 priests (209 diocesan, 4 religious), 341 lay religious (7 brothers, 334 sisters) and 42 seminarians.

Ordinaries

Apostolic Prefects of Zenshu
 Stephen Kim Yang-hong (1937–1941)
 Paul Jae-yong Ju (1941–1946)
 Bartolomeo Hyun-bae Kim (1947–1950)

Apostolic Prefects of Jeonju
 Bartolomeo Hyun-bae Kim (1950–1957)

Apostolic Vicars of Jeonju
 Bartolomeo Hyun-bae Kim (1957–1960)
 Peter Han Kong-ryel (1961–1962)

Bishops of Jeonju
 Peter Han Kong-ryel (1962–1971), appointed Archbishop of Gwangju
 Augustine Jae-deok Kim (1973–1981)
 Michael Pak Jeong-il (1982–1988), appointed Bishop of Masan
 Vincent Ri Pyung-ho (1990–2017)
 John Kim Son-tae (2017–present)

See also 
 List of Catholic Dioceses in Korea

References

Sources and external links 
 GCatholic, with Google map and satellite photo - data for all sections
 Catholic-Hierarchy - Diocese of Jeonju {Chonju, Jeon Ju

Religious organizations established in 1937
Roman Catholic dioceses and prelatures established in the 20th century
Roman Catholic dioceses in South Korea
Buildings and structures in Jeonju
1937 establishments in Korea
Roman Catholic Ecclesiastical Province of Gwangju